In December 2022, the final composition of the second Luiz Inácio Lula da Silva's cabinet was announced after weeks of discussions and analysis by the transition cabinet. The first names were unveiled on 9 December.

Cabinet

Non-cabinet positions

References

Cabinets established in 2023
Cabinets of Brazil
Luiz Inácio Lula da Silva
2023 in Brazilian politics
Current governments